Pachola is a type of prepared meat in Mexican cuisine. is originated of the state of Jalisco. It consists of a flattened and spiced ground beef patty made using a metate (grinding stone). The beef is mixed with ground ancho chili, cumin, garlic and bread, and fried in oil. Pacholas are sometimes grilled.

References

Further reading
 Kennedy, Diana. The Art of Mexican Cooking. (2008) Clarkson Potter. .

Mexican cuisine
Ground meat